Wrestling at the 2014 Summer Youth Olympics was held from 25 to 27 August at the Longjiang Gymnasium in Nanjing, China.

Qualification
Each National Olympic Committee (NOC) can enter a maximum of 5 competitors, 2 in Boys' Freestyle, 2 in Boys' Greco-Roman and 1 in Girls' Freestyle. 98 athletes, 70 male and 28 female qualified over five continental qualification tournament. Each continent qualified 1 athlete in each event while the Americas in Boys' Freestyle, Asia in Boys' Greco-Roman and Girls' Freestyle and Europe in all three qualified a second athlete in each event. Despite being hosts, China was not given any quotas and had to qualify normally. A further 14, 10 male and 4 female athletes was decided by the Tripartite Commission.

To be eligible to participate at the Youth Olympics athletes must have been born between 1 January 1997 and 31 December 1998.

Qualification Timeline

Qualification Summary

Schedule

The schedule was released by the Nanjing Youth Olympic Games Organizing Committee.

All times are CST (UTC+8)

Medal summary

Medal table

Boy's events

Freestyle

Greco-Roman

Girl's events

Freestyle

References

External links
Official Results Book – Wrestling

 
2014 Summer Youth Olympics events
2014 in sport wrestling
2014
International wrestling competitions hosted by China